Jay Leach (born May 24, 1951) is an American former ice hockey assistant coach of the National Hockey League's Los Angeles Kings, Atlanta Thrashers, New Jersey Devils, and Washington Capitals.

Career 
Leach served as assistant coach for Team USA under Bob Johnson in the 1991 Canada Cup. He also served as assistant coach for the U.S. Men's National Team in the 2004 and 2006 World Championships. He also has five years of head coaching experience in the American Hockey League with the Springfield Indians and the Hershey Bears.

On June 25, 2013, Leach was named associate head coach for the University of Maine men's ice hockey team.

Personal life 
Leach's nephew, Jay Leach, was the head coach of the Providence Bruins, and is now an assistant coach with the Seattle Kraken.

References

1951 births
Living people
Atlanta Thrashers coaches
Hartford Whalers coaches
Los Angeles Kings coaches
New Jersey Devils coaches
People from Lexington, Massachusetts
Washington Capitals coaches
Syracuse Hornets players
Hershey Bears coaches
Sportspeople from Middlesex County, Massachusetts
Ice hockey coaches from Massachusetts
American men's ice hockey players
American ice hockey coaches
Ice hockey players from Massachusetts